Kalpi Ouattara (born 29 December 1998) is an Ivorian professional footballer who plays as a left-back for Östersund.

Career
On 20 August 2019, Ouattara joined Allsvenskan side Östersund on loan for the rest of the season from ASEC Mimosas. On 30 August 2019, he made his professional debut for Östersund, playing the full match in a 2–0 loss away to Helsingborgs. On 31 December 2019, the Swedish club confirmed, that they had fully signed Outtara from ASEC Mimosas.

International career
Ouattara debuted for the Ivory Coast national team in a 2–1 2021 Africa Cup of Nations qualification win over Madagascar on 12 November 2020.

References

External links
 

1998 births
Living people
Ivorian footballers
Ivory Coast international footballers
Association football defenders
ASEC Mimosas players
Östersunds FK players
Allsvenskan players
Ivorian expatriate footballers
Expatriate footballers in Sweden
Ivorian expatriate sportspeople in Sweden